David Pollard may refer to:

 David Pollard (cricketer) (1835–1909), English cricketer
 David Pollard (author) (born 1942), British author
 David D. Pollard (born 1943), professor in geomechanics and structural geology